John Allen Wakefield (February 11, 1797 – June 18, 1873) was an American historian, politician, soldier, physician, and lawyer.

Born in Pendleton, South Carolina, Wakefield moved with his family to Tennessee, Kentucky, and then to Illinois, where they settled. During the War of 1812, Wakefield served in the Illinois militia as a scout. He later studied medicine and became a physician. He then studied law and was admitted to the Illinois Bar. Wakefield served in the Illinois House of Representatives as well.

In 1832, Wakefield took part in the Black Hawk War and wrote a book discussing the war, especially the Bad Axe massacre, near present-day Victory, Wisconsin.
Wakefield moved to Saint Paul, Minnesota in 1849, where he owned the Tremont House and became the first justice of the peace.

After living for a time in Iowa, John Wakefield moved to Lawrence, Kansas, where he took part in the Bleeding Kansas events. In 1864, Wakefield served in the Kansas House of Representatives. He died in Lawrence, Kansas, in 1873.

References

Further reading

 Wakefield, John A. and Frank E. Stevens. Wakefield's History of the Black Hawk War. Chicago: The Caxton Club, 1908.

1797 births
1873 deaths
American militiamen in the War of 1812
People from Pendleton, South Carolina
Politicians from Saint Paul, Minnesota
Politicians from Lawrence, Kansas
Bleeding Kansas
Members of the Illinois House of Representatives
Members of the Kansas House of Representatives
American people of the Black Hawk War
19th-century American politicians